The township of Waihola lies between Dunedin and Milton, New Zealand in Otago, in New Zealand's South Island. It lies close to the southeast shore of the shallow tidal lake which shares its name.

The town is located on State Highway 1, and the South Island Main Trunk rail line runs through it, though trains no longer stop. The township is within the boundaries of Clutha District.

Etymology
The name Waihola is accepted to be analogous with the word wai-hora, meaning "spreading waters". The place name for the location of Waihola is assigned as an official place name by the New Zealand Geographic Board. The place name also creates some interest as the Māori alphabet doesn't normally contain the letter 'L'. This is most likely an example of an earlier Southern Māori dialect.

Demographics
Waihola is described by Statistics New Zealand as a rural settlement.

Waihola had a population of 399 at the 2018 New Zealand census, an increase of 45 people (12.7%) since the 2013 census, and an increase of 123 people (44.6%) since the 2006 census. There were 168 households. There were 204 males and 198 females, giving a sex ratio of 1.03 males per female, with 75 people (18.8%) aged under 15 years, 36 (9.0%) aged 15 to 29, 195 (48.9%) aged 30 to 64, and 90 (22.6%) aged 65 or older.

Ethnicities were 94.0% European/Pākehā, 10.5% Māori, 1.5% Asian, and 1.5% other ethnicities (totals add to more than 100% since people could identify with multiple ethnicities).

Although some people objected to giving their religion, 60.2% had no religion, 31.6% were Christian and 3.0% had other religions.

Of those at least 15 years old, 48 (14.8%) people had a bachelor or higher degree, and 93 (28.7%) people had no formal qualifications. The employment status of those at least 15 was that 153 (47.2%) people were employed full-time, 45 (13.9%) were part-time, and 12 (3.7%) were unemployed.

Bruce
The Bruce statistical area also includes Taieri Mouth, and surrounds but does not include Milton.

Bruce had a population of 2,250 at the 2018 New Zealand census, an increase of 207 people (10.1%) since the 2013 census, and an increase of 678 people (43.1%) since the 2006 census. There were 780 households. There were 1,317 males and 939 females, giving a sex ratio of 1.4 males per female. The median age was 43.0 years (compared with 37.4 years nationally), with 399 people (17.7%) aged under 15 years, 330 (14.7%) aged 15 to 29, 1,182 (52.5%) aged 30 to 64, and 342 (15.2%) aged 65 or older.

Ethnicities were 90.3% European/Pākehā, 13.3% Māori, 1.2% Pacific peoples, 1.7% Asian, and 2.0% other ethnicities (totals add to more than 100% since people could identify with multiple ethnicities).

The proportion of people born overseas was 10.9%, compared with 27.1% nationally.

Although some people objected to giving their religion, 57.5% had no religion, 30.7% were Christian, 0.3% were Hindu, 0.3% were Muslim, 0.7% were Buddhist and 3.2% had other religions.

Of those at least 15 years old, 225 (12.2%) people had a bachelor or higher degree, and 426 (23.0%) people had no formal qualifications. The median income was $28,600, compared with $31,800 nationally. 210 people (11.3%) earned over $70,000 compared to 17.2% nationally. The employment status of those at least 15 was that 882 (47.6%) people were employed full-time, 300 (16.2%) were part-time, and 66 (3.6%) were unemployed.

Tourism

Waihola is a popular destination for day-trips from Dunedin, 35 kilometres to the north, and the lake is a venue for many water sports, including waterskiing, rowing, and yachting.

The 2175-hectare Waihola Waipori wetland system is one of the largest and most significant remaining lowland wetland systems in New Zealand. It is a diverse and highly productive ecosystem, supporting threatened species such as the giant kokopu and the South Island Fernbird. The wetland is of great significance to Kai Tahu and is used for recreational hunting and fishing.

The Sinclair Wetlands are also located at Waihola.

Education

The school started in 1859.

Gallery

References

External links
Information about Waihola at CluthaCountry.co.nz

Populated places in Otago
Clutha District
Populated lakeshore places in New Zealand